Potamophilinus costatus, is a species of riffle beetle found in Sri Lanka.

Adult beetles are found under stones and in cascades.

References 

Elmidae
Insects of Sri Lanka
Insects described in 1935